The Beta Test is a 2021 dark comedy thriller film written and directed by Jim Cummings and PJ McCabe. It follows a talent agent whose life is turned upside-down after taking part in a secret sex pact; Cummings and McCabe star alongside Virginia Newcomb and Jessie Barr.

The film premiered at the Berlin International Film Festival on March 1, 2021 and was released in the United States on November 5, 2021. It received positive reviews from critics.

Plot 
A distressed woman calls 911 to report a domestic dispute before confessing to her husband that she recently received a letter inviting her to an anonymous sexual encounter; she accepted the offer and realized she's not happy in her marriage and asks to leave him. The husband murders her with a knife.

Jordan Hines is a smooth talking Hollywood agent who is under constant work stress and five years sober. Although six weeks away from his planned marriage to his fiancée, Caroline, he constantly finds himself distracted by attractive women. He receives a purple envelope with an invitation from an anonymous admirer to a no-strings-attached intimate encounter at a hotel and a form to fill out his sexual interests. He dumps the letter in the trash, but later raids the dumpster and finds it, fills out the invitation and sends it off. After meeting with a potential, high profile Chinese client who later berates him for his agency's practices being obsolete and phony, Jordan receives a second purple envelope with a hotel room keycard. He goes to the hotel room, puts on a blindfold, and has fabulous sex with an anonymous woman who is also blindfolded.

Jordan obsessively investigates the source of the anonymous invitation and the identity of the woman. His new Chinese client had also accepted a similar invitation with another man, and the client's wife shoots and kills him, and the wife of the man he slept with poisons him and herself. Jordan tracks down the delivery person whose bag is filled with anonymous letters in purple envelopes. He investigates one of the addresses and finds the recipient is dead. Jordan's friend PJ theorizes that someone with access to people's social media data, such as recent engagements, websites visited, and liked photos of people they're attracted to, could then have found the addresses of wealthy people who fit the right demographic and sent them letters to connect them for anonymous sex. He suggests it would be inexpensive and very lucrative to set up.

Jordan and his fiancée, having drifted apart as he becomes obsessed with his secret, go to a cabin for a weekend to reconnect. But he continues to rejects her suggestions that there is something going on with him. That night she leads him into passionate sex.

Jordan and his fiancée go to the office of the wedding planner, where Jordan appears to recognize the woman he slept with. She also is there planning a wedding and seems to recognize him at first but claims not to under Jordan's onslaught of embarrassing questions. Jordan resumes his investigation and impersonating a federal agent, investigating the printing press that printed the purple envelopes.

Jordan tracks down and with a hammer attacks the man behind the letters, Johnny, who confesses to sending them based on addresses from The Sony Hacks and further social media scrubbing, in order to match people with their perfect sexual partner. Johnny realizes that Jordan never received the third letter, which would have asked for $5,000 in an anonymous wire transfer in exchange for the identity of the woman he had sex with. He mocks a now-shaken Jordan for being a nobody, initiates his computer program to send out tens of thousands of new letters, and Jordan flees.

In their garage, Caroline catches Jordan burning the evidence of his hotel encounter, where she holds a pair of scissors. Jordan breaks down and confesses not only to infidelity, but drinking, smoking, living a lie and being a fraud. He accepts that Caroline is going to kill him but she forgives him, as she also received the anonymous letters.

Jordan and Caroline escape together and drive towards the border. At a diner Caroline holds her belly and reads news that eight more people have been killed. She explains that they are going to do everything they can to trip the two of them up. The attractive waitress writes her number on the bill she hands to Jordan.

Cast
 Jim Cummings as Jordan Hines
 Virginia Newcomb as Caroline Gates
 PJ McCabe as PJ
 Jessie Barr as Lauren
 Kevin Changaris
 Olivia Grace Applegate
 Christian Hillborg
 Malin Barr as Annie
 Jacqueline Doke as Jaclyn
 Wilky Lau as Raymond Lee

Production
Filming wrapped in December 2019 and post-production was done remotely throughout 2020 due to the COVID-19 pandemic.

Release
The film premiered at the 71st Berlin International Film Festival. IFC Films acquired U.S. distribution rights in March 2021 and set it for a November 5, 2021 wide release in the United States. It had its North American premiere at the 20th Tribeca Film Festival on June 11, 2021, in the Viewpoints section.

It was invited to screen at the 25th Bucheon International Fantastic Film Festival, in July 2021, competing in Bucheon Choice Features section.

Reception
On Rotten Tomatoes the film holds an approval rating of 92% based on 87 reviews, with an average rating of 7/10. The site's critics' consensus reads: "A darkly amusing thriller that discomfits as it entertains, The Beta Test satirizes Hollywood with savage flair." According to Metacritic, which sampled 18 critics and calculated a weighted average score of 72 out of 100, the film received "generally favorable reviews".

Owen Gleiberman of Variety wrote that "The film's elements don't mesh as seamlessly as they should have", and added that the film "is almost too ambitious, tucking a surfeit of ideas into its heightened surrealist mindscape. Yet the movie, at its best, can hold you in its grip."

References

External links
 

2021 films
2020s English-language films
American horror thriller films
British horror thriller films
Films directed by Jim Cummings (filmmaker)
Films impacted by the COVID-19 pandemic
2021 directorial debut films
IFC Films films
2021 horror thriller films
2020s American films
2020s British films